Charlotte Catherine de La Trémoïlle (1568 – 29 August 1629) was a French noblewoman and, by marriage, Princess of Condé. By birth she belonged to the House of La Trémoïlle.

Biography
Charlotte Catherine was the youngest of five children born to Louis III de La Trémoille and Jeanne de Montmorency, Duke and Duchess of Thouars, members of two of France's oldest and most powerful families. Her father's family, the La Trémoïlles, held the rank of prince étranger at the French court, and her father was a loyalist of the House of Valois. Her maternal grandfather, Anne de Montmorency, Duke of Montmorency, had been taken captive with King Francis I of France, at the Battle of Pavia in February 1525.

She was married at between 17 and 18 years of age, on 16 March 1586 in the chateau de Taillebourg, after converting from Roman Catholicism to Protestantism. Her husband, Henri de Bourbon, Prince de Condé, son of the late Louis de Bourbon, Prince de Condé and Eléanor de Roucy de Roye, was one of the most important men in the kingdom, both as military leader of the Huguenots and, after his cousin obtained the French throne as Henry IV, ranked as heir presumptive and premier prince du sang. The couple took up residence at a home of Condé's in Saint-Jean-d'Angély in southwestern France.

As part of her dowry of 20,000 écus d'or and 4 000 livres in annual allowance, Charlotte Catherine brought numerous properties into the Bourbon family which helped settle the debts of her husband's family.

One year and six weeks after the wedding, Charlotte Catherine gave birth to Éléonore de Bourbon-Condé (1587-1619), who would become the Princess of Orange in 1606 upon marrying the eldest son of William the Silent.

Having been wounded in battle at Coutras in September 1587, Charlotte Catherine's husband was recuperating at Saint-Jean-d'Angély when he died suddenly on 3 March 1588. An autopsy indicated he might have been poisoned and, being about three months pregnant at the time (some said, by her page, Prémilhac de Belcastel) Charlotte Catherine was deemed to have a potential motive and was arrested for murder, as was a Condé household servant by the name of Brillant who was put to death after being tortured. She gave birth in a tower of the castle at Saint-Jean-d'Angély to a son, Henri de Bourbon. Tried and condemned to death, she appealed her judgment to the Parlement de Paris but remained imprisoned under close surveillance.

In 1592 the still childless and Protestant King Henry IV chose to recognise her son as his legitimate, heir presumptive and, as the child's godfather, arranged that he be christened with Huguenot rites but then promptly conducted to Saint-Germain-en-Laye Abbey to be raised as a Catholic, despite the House of Condé's Calvinism. Young Henri remained heir presumptive after the king's conversion to Catholicism in 1593 and until the birth of his son, the future Louis XIII, in 1601.

After six years imprisonment Charlotte Catherine was released and, in August 1595, vindicated by the Parlement. In 1596 she abjured Calvinism, once again becoming a Catholic, and was allowed to take up residence in Paris.  There her son, the Prince de Condé, held for the remainder of his life the position of premier prince du sang, a rank henceforth retained by the Condés until claimed by the House of Bourbon-Orléans in the 18th century.

Charlotte Catherine was buried at the (demolished in the 19th century) church of the Sainte-Claire de l'Ave Maria monastery (monastère Sainte-Claire de l'Ave Maria), situated not far from the Hôtel de Sens in Paris.

Issue
Éléonore de Bourbon (30 April 1587–20 January 1619) married Philip William, Prince of Orange, no issue;
Henri de Bourbon, Prince of Condé (1 September 1588–26 December 1646) married Charlotte Marguerite de Montmorency and had issue including le Grand Condé.

Ancestry

References and notes

External link

1568 births
1629 deaths
16th-century French women
17th-century French women
Charlotte Catherine
Charlotte Catherine
Charlotte Catherine
Charlotte Catherine
Charlotte Catherine
Charlotte Catherine